Samir Beloufa (born 27 August 1979) is an Algerian former professional footballer who played as a centre-back.

Club career
Beloufa played in the Italian Serie A he played for AC Milan, and Monza in Serie B. He also played with Mouscron and Germinal Beerschot in Belgium.

Beloufa transferred to Helsingborg from Belgium club Westerlo in March 2007. In November 2008, his contract with Helsingborg was not extended and he was released.

International career 
Beloufa made nine appearances for the Algeria national team since 2004. He was part of the Algerian 2004 African Nations Cup team, who finished second in their group in the first round of competition before being defeated by Morocco in the quarter-finals.

Career statistics

International

Honours 
AC Milan
 Torneo di Viareggio 1999

References

External links
 
 
 

1979 births
Living people
French sportspeople of Algerian descent
Sportspeople from Melun
Algerian footballers
Association football central defenders
AS Cannes  players
A.C. Milan players
A.C. Monza players
Beerschot A.C. players
SC Bastia players
Royal Excel Mouscron players
K.V.C. Westerlo players
Helsingborgs IF players
R. Olympic Charleroi Châtelet Farciennes players
Championnat National 2 players
Serie A players
Serie B players
Belgian Pro League players
Ligue 1 players
Allsvenskan players
Belgian Third Division players
Algeria international footballers
2004 African Cup of Nations players
Algerian expatriate footballers
Algerian expatriate sportspeople in Italy
Algerian expatriate sportspeople in Belgium
Algerian expatriate sportspeople in Sweden
Expatriate footballers in Italy
Expatriate footballers in Belgium
Expatriate footballers in Sweden
Footballers from Seine-et-Marne